The Canterbury Cricket Umpires' Association Pavilion in Christchurch, New Zealand, is a historic cricket pavilion. Built in 1864, it was registered by Heritage New Zealand as a Category II historic place on 11 December 2003. It forms part of Hagley Oval.

References

Buildings and structures in Christchurch
Heritage New Zealand Category 2 historic places in Canterbury, New Zealand
1864 establishments in New Zealand
Cricket grounds in New Zealand
1860s architecture in New Zealand